Zandberg is a surname. Notable people with the surname include:

Adrian Zandberg (born 1979), Polish politician
Gerhard Zandberg (born 1983), South African swimmer
Michael Zandberg (born 1980), Israeli footballer
Tamar Zandberg (born 1976), Israeli politician
Eduard Zandberg (born 1996), South African Professional rugby player

Dutch-language surnames
Jewish surnames